Senator Magee may refer to:

Christopher Magee (politician) (1848–1901), Pennsylvania State Senate
William A. Magee (1873–1938), Pennsylvania State Senate

See also
William J. Magie (1832–1917), New Jersey State Senate